Colonia is an unincorporated community and census-designated place (CDP) located within Woodbridge Township, in Middlesex County, New Jersey, United States. As of the 2010 United States Census, the CDP's population was 17,795.

In 1919, the New Jersey State Highway Commission built a new road that became part of the Lincoln Highway, an early plan to create a transcontinental highway. The stretch was constructed on the west side of the Pennsylvania Railroad (now the Northeast Corridor) from near the northeast of Dow Avenue between Colonia and Iselin to Cedar Street in Menlo Park, to avoid two railroad crossings. The old road is now Middlesex-Essex Turnpike and Thornall Street, on the east side of the tracks.

Geography
According to the United States Census Bureau, the CDP had a total area of 3.914 square miles (10.137 km2), including 3.910 square miles (10.126 km2) of land and 0.004 square miles (0.011 km2) of water (0.11%). It has a hot-summer humid continental climate (Dfa) and average monthly temperatures range from 31.2 °F in January to 76.1 °F in July.

The Garden State Parkway passes through the western portion of the CDP but does not interchange there. For northbound Garden State Parkway traffic only there is a service plaza in Colonia, that is the parkway's only area located on private property.

Demographics

Census 2010

Census 2000
As of the 2000 United States Census there were 17,811 people, 6,184 households, and 5,077 families residing in the CDP. The population density was 1,772.4/km2 (4,594.1/mi2). There were 6,254 housing units at an average density of 622.3/km2 (1,613.1/mi2). The racial makeup of the CDP was 86.00% White, 4.76% African American, 0.10% Native American, 6.31% Asian, 0.06% Pacific Islander, 1.27% from other races, and 1.50% from two or more races. Hispanic or Latino of any race were 4.97% of the population.

There were 6,184 households, out of which 35.0% had children under the age of 18 living with them, 68.7% were married couples living together, 10.3% had a female householder with no husband present, and 17.9% were non-families. 15.2% of all households were made up of individuals, and 8.7% had someone living alone who was 65 years of age or older. The average household size was 2.88 and the average family size was 3.21.

In the CDP the population was spread out, with 23.7% under the age of 18, 6.2% from 18 to 24, 29.1% from 25 to 44, 24.8% from 45 to 64, and 16.2% who were 65 years of age or older. The median age was 40 years. For every 100 females, there were 93.0 males. For every 100 females age 18 and over, there were 88.4 males.

The median income for a household in the CDP was $67,372, and the median income for a family was $76,090. Males had a median income of $50,260 versus $36,657 for females. The per capita income for the CDP was $27,732. About 1.5% of families and 2.2% of the population were below the poverty line, including 2.0% of those under age 18 and 4.0% of those age 65 or over.

Parks and recreation
Merrill Park is a Middlesex County park located on the south branch of the Rahway River. The park was created as a "Progressive Playground" and spans . The park's maintenance is handled by funding from the municipality, local schools, community groups and local businesses. The park includes an animal haven with pigs, goats, peacocks, horses and other animals and birds. Merrill Park includes 4 tennis courts, 3 baseball fields, a soccer field, 7 picnic groves that can be reserved in advance, the progressive playground, an animal haven, a football field, 2 basketball courts, 2 softball fields, 2 open picnic groves, and 3 other playgrounds. The football field and soccer field are surrounded by a walkway for joggers as well. The animal haven is free and there is no charge to view the animals. There are numerous small trails around the park.

Education
Public schools

Schools in Colonia operated as part of the Woodbridge Township School District are:

Elementary schools (K-5)
 Claremont Avenue Elementary School #20 - Claremont Avenue, Colonia
 Lynn Crest Elementary School #22 - New Dover Road, Colonia
 Oak Ridge Heights Elementary School #21 - Inman Avenue
 Pennsylvania Avenue Elementary School #27 - Pennsylvania Avenue

Middle school (6th-8th)
 Colonia Middle School - Delaware Avenue

High school (9th-12th)
 Colonia High School - East Street

Private/religious school (K-8th)
 St. John Vianney Grammar School - 420 Inman Avenue

Notable people

People who were born in, residents of, or otherwise closely associated with Colonia include:
 John Carlson (born 1990), defenseman and Stanley Cup champion (2018) with the Washington Capitals.
 John Gorka (born 1958), contemporary folk singer/songwriter.
 Kelsey Grammer (born 1955), actor who appeared in Frasier and Cheers.
 Tom Higgins (born 1954), former American and Canadian football player.
 Stewart Krentzman (born 1951), CEO of Oki Data Americas, Inc.
 Eric LeGrand (born 1990), defensive tackle the Rutgers Scarlet Knights football team who was paralyzed during a game.
 Glen Mason (born 1950), NCAA football coach.
 Laura McCullough (born 1960), poet.
 Zack Rosen (born 1989), All-American basketball player at Penn; plays for Maccabi Ashdod in Israel.
 Bret Schundler (born 1959), New Jersey Republican politician.
 Tico Torres (born 1953), drummer for Bon Jovi.

See also
List of neighborhoods in Woodbridge Township, New Jersey
List of neighborhoods in Edison, New Jersey

References

Neighborhoods in Woodbridge Township, New Jersey
Census-designated places in Middlesex County, New Jersey